The Boston Business Journal is a weekly, business-oriented newspaper published in Boston, Massachusetts. It is published by the American City Business Journals.

The newspaper was founded by Robert Bergenheim and launched its first issue on March 2, 1981. The newspaper was originally named "P&L The Boston Business Journal" ("P&L" stood for profit and loss). However, "P&L" was later dropped from the name. Bergenheim was a former publisher of the Boston Herald. Before that, he was an editor at The Christian Science Monitor.

See also
List of newspapers in Massachusetts

References

Business newspapers published in the United States
Newspapers published in Boston
1981 establishments in Massachusetts
Newspapers established in 1981